11 Librae is a single, fifth-magnitude star in the southern zodiac constellation of Libra. It is faintly visible to the naked eye with an apparent visual magnitude is 4.93. The star is moving further from the Sun with a heliocentric radial velocity of +83.6 km/s.

This star has a stellar classification of K0 III/IV, indicating the spectrum displays mixed traits of a giant/subgiant K-type star. Alves (2000) and Afşar et al. (2012) classify it as a red clump star, which means it is an evolved star at the cool end of the horizontal branch and is generating energy through helium fusion in its core region. It is about five billion years old and is spinning with a projected rotational velocity of 4 km/s. The star has 1.1 times the mass of the Sun and has expanded to over 10 times the Sun's radius. It is radiating around 59 times the Sun's radius from its enlarged photosphere at an effective temperature of about 4,749 K.

References

K-type giants
Horizontal-branch stars
Libra (constellation)
Durchmusterung objects
Librae, 11
130952
072631
5535